HMS St John was a Royal Navy 6 gun schooner attacked by American colonists in Newport, Rhode Island in 1764.

History
Rhode Islanders were violently opposed to the passage of the Sugar Act in 1764, because the colony's main industry was producing rum from molasses. To collect the tax, the British sent several ships to New England, including .

In 1764, crew members on another British ship, HMS St John, had allegedly stolen goods from Newport merchants. Therefore, a group of Rhode Islanders took control of Fort George on Goat Island in Newport harbor and fired cannon shots at the British ship. The shots were one of the first open acts of rebellion against the British government in America.

The Rhode Islanders were acting under orders from local officials, but they dispersed before HMS Squirrel, a twenty-gun ship, arrived at the scene. St John successfully fled the harbor and played a part in moving gunpowder away from Nassau on 4 March 1776 following the amphibious raid on Fort Montagu.

See also
  
 Gaspee Affair

References

External links
 

Newport County, Rhode Island
Maritime incidents in 1764
Frigates of the Royal Navy